José Acacio de Barros (born 1967, Barra Mansa, RJ, Brazil) is a Brazilian-American physicist and philosopher with contributions to the foundations of quantum mechanics, quantum cosmology, and quantum cognition. Dr. de Barros received his PhD in Physics from the Centro Brasileiro de Pesquisas Fisicas (CBPF) in 1991 under the supervision of Francisco Antonio Doria and Antonio Fernandes da Fonseca Teixeira (he was also informally under the supervision of Newton da Costa). Since 2007 he has been in the Liberal Studies faculty of San Francisco State University. Before going to San Francisco, he was an associate professor of physics at the Federal University at Juiz de Fora, Brazil, and he was a visiting associate professor at the Center for the Study of Language and Information at Stanford University, and has also held visiting positions at the Centro Brasileiro de Pesquisas Fisicas. Dr. de Barros has been a long-term collaborator of Philosopher Patrick Suppes, with whom he published extensively on the foundations of quantum mechanics and joint probabilities. Among his most influential work is his joint research with Nelson Pinto-Neto, in which Bohm's interpretation of quantum mechanics was applied to quantum cosmology, paving the way for bouncing models using realistic interpretation of quantum mechanics. His recent work attempts to give a neurophysiological foundation to quantum-like effects in psychology. He is also among the main proponents, in collaboration with Gary Oas, of the use of negative probabilities to understand quantum systems.

References

External links 
 Acacio de Barros's page on his SFSU's website

1967 births
Living people
Brazilian philosophers
Brazilian physicists